The Upper Darby Fire Department (UDFD) provides fire protection services to the Township of Upper Darby, Pennsylvania.

About the Upper Darby Fire Department 

The Upper Darby Fire Department has the responsibility of providing fire suppression and rescue services to a population which numbers approximately 81,821 residents within the approximately seven point six two (7.62) square mile Township of Upper Darby.

The Department consists of five stations within the township: the Garrettford Drexel Hill Fire Company, established on March 12, 1908, the Highland Park Fire Company established November 29, 1911, the Upper Darby Fire Company established in 1916, the Cardington-Stonehurst Fire Company established on January 16, 1916, and the Primos Secane Westbrook Park Fire Company established in 1955.  Each of the five stations make up the five operations districts of the township.

The Fire Department is a combination department, staffed by both a professional career staff and volunteer staff.  Each of the five stations is staffed by volunteers, while only four stations are staffed by career members.  Highland Park, Upper Darby, Cardington-Stonehurst and Primos-Secane-Westbrook Park all are staffed by both career and volunteer firefighters while Garrettford-Drexel Hill is the only station in the township to be staffed by volunteers only.

Divisions 

The Upper Darby Fire Department consists of five divisions, Operations, Fire Prevention, Training and Administration, and the Fire Investigations Division.

Operations:  The Operations Division is responsible for the fire suppression and rescue operations of the Fire Department, encompassing the five fire houses of the department.  The Operations Division also consists of the Fire Department's Technical Rescue Unit, Hazardous Materials Operations, as well as the Fire Marshal's Office.

Fire Prevention:  The Fire Prevention Division is responsible for all fire prevention activities throughout the township.  The Fire Prevention Unit oversees all fire safety activities throughout all the schools in Upper Darby, as well as offering several programs designed to promote fire safety.  These programs include free smoke detectors for the elderly/disabled, intervention for kids who are prone to setting fires, and deployment of the Fire Safety Trailer at community events.

Training and Administration:  The Training and Administration Division is responsible for the training of the department's firefighters, as well as anything of administrative jurisdiction.  The Training and Administration Division consists of a Director of Training and Administration as well as a Department Secretary.

Community Affairs:  The Community Affairs Division is responsible for all community relations aspects within the fire department.  The Community Affairs Division works in conjunction with the Fire Prevention Division for many of the different functions.  Among these functions include the Fire Prevention Parade and the National Night Out.  In addition, each station's volunteers as well as the IAFF are responsible for their own social media.

Fire Investigation Division: The Fire Investigation Division is responsible for investigating the origin and cause of all fires within Upper Darby Township and/or any community requesting the assistance from the qualified fire investigators employed by the Upper Darby Township Fire Department. The fire investigation division works closely with the Upper Darby Police Department Detectives Unit if a crime is suspected during an origin and cause investigation.

Ranks Structure

Facilities and Equipment 

Apparatus Glossary:

ENG - Engine

LAD - Ladder

SQ - Squrt

SD - Squad

RES - Rescue

Q - Quint

TR - Truck

TW - Tower

MSU - Mask Service Unit

8 - Utility Vehicle

Social media 
The Upper Darby Fire Department operates various social media accounts on various platforms, such as Twitter, Facebook and Instagram.

Drexel Hill Fire Company
@DrexelHillFC20 - Twitter
@GDHVFC - Facebook

Primos-Secane-Westbrook Park Fire Company
@UDFDSecane - Facebook/Instagram/Twitter

UDPFFA
@UDPFFA - Facebook
@UDFDLocal2493 - Twitter

External links and References 
 Official Site 
 
 

Fire departments in Pennsylvania